The Canada Soccer Hall of Fame honours people and institutions for their contributions to Canadian soccer. It was founded in 1997 by the Ontario Soccer Association and was originally located in Vaughan, Ontario. As of 2019, the Canada Soccer Hall of Fame has inducted 114 players, 13 managers/coaches, 10 officials, and 40 builders as honoured members. Additionally, the Canada Soccer Hall of Fame has recognized 13 teams of distinction and seven organizations of distinction.

After the Canadian Soccer Association Alumni Association was founded in 1987, the Soccer Hall of Fame was founded by the Ontario Soccer Association in 1997 in Vaughan. The new Canada Soccer Hall of Fame was launched in May 2017 under the direction of the Canadian Soccer Association in Ottawa, Ontario. All previously-inducted members of The Soccer Hall of Fame as well as a catch-up class of 17 legends were named to the new Canada Soccer Hall of Fame.

Honoured members
As of 2019, the Canada Soccer Hall of Fame has inducted 177 honoured members. The honoured members are organized in four categories: Players, Coaches/Managers, Officials, and Builders. The next class of honoured members will be inducted in 2023.

Names in italics are those persons inducted under the "Pioneer" category (established in 2007) or "Veteran Canadian Players" category (as the category was renamed in 2017). The next group of Veteran Canadian Players will be inducted in 2019.

Players

Coaches

Officials

Builders

Teams and organizations of distinction

Teams of distinction

Organizations of distinction
Edmonton Angels: 2014
Montreal Carsteel: 2015
Robbie International Youth Tournament: 2014
Toronto Ulster United: 2011
Vancouver Columbus F.C.: 2013
Vancouver Firefighters: 2010
Victoria West: 2012

Past awards

Brian Budd Award recipients

The Brian Budd Award recognizes those who have excelled both in soccer and in another endeavours but who might not otherwise qualify for induction. The candidate must exemplify good character, show outstanding dedication, achievements and leadership in developing soccer in Canada and provide inspiration to past, present and future generations. The award honours the late Brian Budd, a Canadian soccer player who won the Superstars World Championship competition three years in a row from 1978 to 1980.

Marc Rizzardo: 2014
Gerry Dobson: 2013
Carl Shearer: 2012
Peter Sloly: 2011
Peter Zezel: 2010

References

External links

 
 Canada Soccer Hall of Fame Class of 2017
 Canada Soccer Hall of Fame Class of 2018
 Canada Soccer Hall of Fame Class of 2019
 Canada Soccer Hall of Fame Class of 2020
 Canada Soccer Hall of Fame Class of 2021
 Canada Soccer Hall of Fame Class of 2022

Association football museums and halls of fame
Halls of fame in Canada
Canadian soccer trophies and awards